Agata Morio (born 12 September 1948) is a Japanese folk rock singer-songwriter and actor. He also directed three films.

Biography
Agata was born in Rumoi, Hokkaido.

His 1972 debut single Sekishoku Erejī (literary translated as Red Elegy) sold more than a half million copies and still remains his biggest hit. The title of the song was named after the manga series Red Colored Elegy by Seiichi Hayashi.

Discography

Singles
(Selected)
 Sekishoku Erejī (25 April 1972)
 Jurietta no Natsu (21 June 1987)
 Sairento Ibu (5 October 1993)
 Kitto Kitto !! Tōku Tōku !!  (15 March 1995)
 Torikago no Machi (25 February 1996)

Albums
 Chikuonban (1970)
 Otome no Yume (1972)
 Aa Mujo (1974)
 Boku wa Tenshi ja Naiyo (1975, a soundtrack album, collaboration with Eiichi Otaki)
 Nippon Shōnen (Jipangu Boy) (1976)
 Kimi no koto Sukinanda (1977)
 Norimono Zukan (1980)
 Eien no Engoku (1985)
 Eien no Engoku no Uta (1986)
 Bando Neon no Jagā (1987)
 Bando Neon no Jagā to Aoneko (1987)
 Mikkīo no Densetsu (1988)
 Puranettsu Ābento (1990, live)
 Imitation Gold (5 November 1993)
 Pirosumania Umi e Iku (26 January 1994)
 Ōtobai Shōjo (1 August 1994, a soundtrack album)
 24ji no Wakusei (26 July 1995)
 Dai-nana Tōei Awa (25 March 1996)
 Agata Morio no Rajio Shō (1996, live)
 Minato no Rokisī (22 October 1999, a soundtrack album)
 Nihon Shōnen 2000kei (12 January 1999)
 Satou Keiko Sensei wa Zankokuna Hito desukedo (21 November 2001)
 Gineoberude (Aoi Banana) (2004)
 Tarphology ( 20 September 2007 )
 Yuya Uchida I do not know is the sunset glow of the universe I know ( 14 February 2011 )
 Everyone loves Erika ( 21 September 2011 )
 Codomo album ( 30 November 2012 · Agata Morio and Yuko Yamasaki in name)
 Pavement with a woman and a man ( 9 May 2012 ) * Cover collection of movie music
 COBALT TARUPHONIC Music Bunches 1 – 3 ( 9 May 2012 )
 Chicken childhood ( 20 December 2012 )
 Supaka Tamagu (LP 24 December 2013 , CD 10 March 2014)
 Urashima 64 ( 15 November 2014 LP, CD 3 December)
 Urashima 65 BC ( 20 July 2015 )
 Urashima 65 XX ( 30 November 2015 )
 Modern lock (18 November 2016)
 Daibuni ( 26 April 2017) * Agata Morio and Hachimitsu Pai Meigi
 Ideal Socks and Ships ( 26 December 2018 )
 Sightseeing Souvenirs, from the Third Planet ( 18 December 2019 )

Filmography
This is the complete list of the films that Agata directed.
 Boku wa Tenshi ja Naiyo (1975)
 Ōtobai Shōjo (1994)
 Minato no Rokisī (1999)
 Hakodate Coffee  (2016)

He was part of the cast of Biri Gal (2015).

Notes

External links
 
 Profile at Vi-vo

Living people
1948 births
Musicians from Hokkaido
Japanese male singer-songwriters
Japanese singer-songwriters
Japanese male actors
Japanese film directors